Calappa may refer to:
 Calappa (crab), a genus of crabs, including the box crab
 Calappa, a genus of palms in the family Arecaceae; synonym of Cocos